Layia leucopappa is a rare species of flowering plant in the family Asteraceae known by the common name Comanche Point tidytips, or Comanche Point layia.

Distribution
The annual wildflower is endemic to California, where it is known only from the Tehachapi Mountains of southern Kern County in the vicinity of Tejon Ranch. Its distribution once extended onto the floor of the Central Valley, but it was eliminated from the area as the valley land was claimed for agriculture.

Description
The leaves are fleshy and hairless except for ciliated edges. Smaller leaves are oval or oblong in shape and the larger ones are lobed and up to about 4 centimeters long.

The flower head contains white to cream-colored ray florets and yellow disc florets with yellow anthers.

The fruit is an achene; fruits from the disc florets are coated in white hairs and have a white pappus.

References

External links
Jepson Manual Treatment — Layia leucopappa
USDA Plants Profile: Layia leucopappa (Comanche Point tidytips)
Endangered Species Recovery Program: L. leucopappa
Layia leucopappa — U.C. Photos gallery

leucopappa
Endemic flora of California
~
Natural history of the California chaparral and woodlands
Natural history of the Central Valley (California)
Natural history of the Transverse Ranges
Natural history of Kern County, California
Plants described in 1935